Darcy Curran Reeves is an American businessman, journalist and politician who has served as the 64th mayor of Pensacola since 2022.

The son of James J. Reeves, he worked for the Florida State University's student newspaper, the Pensacola News Journal, Warchant.com and the Tuscaloosa News before being hired as chief of Staff for Quint Studer.

Reeves was the CEO of Perfect Plain Brewing Co., a brewing business, which he co-founded with Reed Odeneal, and sold to New Orleans-based Urban South Brewery in 2022.

Early life and career 
Darcy Curran Reeves was born in Pensacola, Florida to Connie Bookman and Jim Reeves, attorney and politician who served as a member of the Florida House of Representatives from the 4th district from 1977 to 1983.

Reeves first wrote an article for the Pensacola News Journal when he was 16 years old. In 2002, Reeves graduated from Pensacola Catholic High School before going to Florida State University, where he was the editor of the school's student newspaper. After that, he "gave himself 10 years to really hone his craft and see how far he could get as a sportswriter." After working for the Pensacola News Journal for four years, he was hired by WarChant.com, a FSU news website. In 2013, he was hired by the Tuscaloosa News to cover the Alabama Crimson Tide football team.

In 2015, while Reeves was working at Tuscaloosa News, he was asked to work for Quint Studer, the founder of Studer Group, a healthcare consulting company. At the time, Studer was trying to get better at social media management. He spent six years as Studer's chief of Staff.

From the traveling he had done, Reeves visited many local craft brewery businesses, and wondered why there was none in Pensacola. He had talked about opening a brewery with his friend and homebrewer Reed Odeneal, but original only in a joking manner. Reeves co-founded Perfect Plain Brewing Co. with Odeneal, and opened the brewery in November 2017. In 2019, he authored The Microbrewery Handbook, a how-to guide to understanding the business of opening a brewery that was published by Wiley & Sons. In October 2022, Reeves sold Perfect Plain Brewery, along with The Well, Perennial, and Garden & Grain, three other businesses he founded with Odeneal, to Urban South Brewery, a New Orleans-based business.

In 2019, Reeves was the lead staff on the Mayoral Transition team for Mayor Grover C. Robinson IV, and was the Chief Entrepreneur Officer at The Spring Entrepreneur Hub. From 2020 – 2021, Reeves served as chairman of the board for Visit Pensacola, the community's tourism marketing organization.

Mayor of Pensacola

2022 Pensacola mayoral election

On September 1, 2021, Reeves announced his candidacy for mayor of Pensacola in 2022. On August 23, 2022, in the primary election, Reeves earned the majority, 7,682 votes (51.11%), against three opponents, Jewell Cannada-Wynn, Sherri Myers and Steven Sharp. Because Reeves earned the majority in the primary, there was no runoff election on November 8.

Mayor of Pensacola
On November 22, 2022, Reeves was sworn in as the 64th mayor of Pensacola, succeeding Grover C. Robinson IV. At 38 years old, Reeves is the youngest mayor since J. Harvey Bayliss, appointed mayor in 1921, a span of 101 years.

See also 

 List of mayors of Pensacola, Florida

References

External links 

 Campaign Website

Living people
Mayors of Pensacola, Florida
Florida State University alumni
21st-century American politicians
People from Pensacola, Florida
Year of birth missing (living people)